A lifeguard is an emergency service worker.

Lifeguard may also refer to:

Entertainment
 Lifeguard (film), a 1976 film starring Sam Elliott and Anne Archer
 The Lifeguard, a 2013 film starring Kristen Bell and David Lambert
 Lifeguard (reality TV series)
 Lifeguard, a book by James Patterson
 The Lifeguard, a novel in the Point Horror series, written by Richie Tankersley Cusick
 "Lifeguard", a short story in the collection Pigeon Feathers by John Updike
 Lifeguard (comics), an X-Men character

Military
 Life guard, a military elite or bodyguard unit in European countries
 Life Guards (United Kingdom), a British Army regiment
 Life Guards (Sweden), a Swedish Army regiment
 Royal Bavarian Infantry Lifeguards Regiment, a Bavarian Army regiment
 Royal Life Guards (Denmark), a Danish Army regiment
 Commander-in-Chief's Guard or Washington's Life Guard, was a short-lived Continental Army infantry and cavalry unit (1776–1783)

Other
 Lifeguard (automobile safety), a 1956 safety package marketed by the Ford Motor Company